Inilah Jac is the second album released in 2006 by Jaclyn Victor since winning Malaysian Idol.
The album were re-released in August 2007, with new tracks and music videos.

Track listing

Limited Edition (Re-Release, 2007)

The re-release version also features a VCD that includes music videos as follows: 
"Satu Harapan" (Music Video; Version 1)
"Satu Harapan" (Music Video; Version 2)
"Ipoh Mali" (Music Video)
"Cepat-Cepat" (Music Video)
"Ceritera Cinta" (Music Video)
"Wajah" (Music Video)
"Gemilang" (Music Video)

Awards
Anugerah Industri Muzik 2007
Best Female Vocal Performance in an Album (Inilah Jac)
Anugerah Juara Lagu Ke-22 (2008)
Best Vocals for "Ceritera Cinta" (with Lah)
Finalist in Ballad Category for "Ceritera Cinta"
Redbox Karaoke Chart 2008 Awards
No 6 Ceritera Cinta

References

2006 albums
Jaclyn Victor albums
Sony BMG albums
Malay-language albums